Rodolfo Pini Giovio (12 November 1926 – 31 May 2000) was a Uruguayan footballer, who played for Club Nacional de Football.

For the Uruguay national football team, he was part of the 1950 FIFA World Cup winning team, but did not play in any matches in the tournament.

References

World Cup Champions Squads 1930 - 2002
A primeira grande zebra do Mundial (in Spanish)

1926 births
2000 deaths
Uruguayan footballers
Uruguay international footballers
1950 FIFA World Cup players
FIFA World Cup-winning players
Uruguayan Primera División players
Club Nacional de Football players
Rampla Juniors players
Rampla Juniors managers
Association football midfielders